Robert Drake was the member of the Parliament of England for Marlborough for the parliament of 1395.

References 

Members of Parliament for Marlborough
English MPs 1395
Year of birth unknown
Year of death unknown